Cheikh Tidiane Gaye is a Senegalese-Italian writer. His first novel was published in Italy, with the title  Il giuramento (The oath, Liberodiscrivere, 2001), followed by Mery principessa albina (2005), and Il canto del Djali (The Song of Djali, 2007), published by Edizioni dell'Arco.

Awards
He has received literary awards and attended several poetry readings and meetings in Italy. In 2003, he participated in the contest Genova città della poesia europea, where he received an award for A mio padre Mandela (To my father Mandela). In March 2003, he was invited in Rome to present his writings during the cultural festival Journées de la Francophonie, organized by the French embassies in Italy. His poems won prizes in poetry competition Sulle orme di Ada Negri in Lodi and he received a special mention at the IX International Contest di Trieste Scritture di Frontiera, the Literary Award dedicated to Umberto Saba.

Activities
In 2009, he published his fourth book Ode nascente, a collection of poems, a bilingual edition in French and Italian. In 2010, he published  Per una tazzina di caffè (For a cup of coffee), Ediesse publisher, a novel included in the collection Permesso di soggiorno, gli scrittori stranieri raccontano Italia, coordinated by Angelo Ferracuti. 
In May 2010, he received the International Prize  Premio internazionale di Letteratura Europa, for the collection Ode nascente.

He is involved in several events and issues related to Africa, integration, intercultural and literature of migration. He lives and works in Milan.

Published works 
 Il Giuramento, Liberodiscrivere, Genova, 2001.
 Mery, principessa albina, Edizioni dell'Arco, Milano, 2005.
 Il Canto del Djali, Edizioni dell'Arco, Milano, 2007.
 Ode nascente/Ode naissante, Edizioni dell'Arco, 2009.

References
Biography of Cheikh Tidiane
Biography of Ediarco publisher
El-ghibli literary magazine
Romamultietnica
Ode nascente

External links

 Personal homepage of Cheikh Tidiane Gaye

Senegalese novelists
 Senegalese emigrants to Italy
1971 births
Italian male writers
Living people
People from Thiès
Male novelists